Edwin Knox (July 24, 1914 – January 19, 2004) was an American water polo player. He competed in the men's tournament at the 1948 Summer Olympics. In 1983, he was inducted into the USA Water Polo Hall of Fame.

References

External links
 

1914 births
2004 deaths
American male water polo players
Olympic water polo players of the United States
Water polo players at the 1948 Summer Olympics
People from Cheyenne County, Colorado